Afer ignifer is a species of large sea snail, marine gastropod mollusc in the family Buccinidae.

Description
The shell of Afner ignifer features a triangular crest, down to a hollow, less dense bottom.

Distribution

References

 Fraussen K. & Trencart A. 2008. A colourful surprise from Senegal: the discovery of a new Afer (Gastropoda: Buccinidae). Gloria Maris, 47(3): 41-47

External links

ignifer
Gastropods described in 2008